Coal in Turkey generates between a quarter and a third of the nation's electricity. There are 54 active coal-fired power stations with a total capacity of 21 gigawatts (GW).

Air pollution from coal-fired power stations is damaging public health, and it is estimated that a coal phase-out by 2030 instead of by the 2050s would save over 100 thousand lives.  Flue gas emission limits were improved in 2020, but data from mandatory reporting of emission levels is not made public. Turkey has not ratified the Gothenburg Protocol, which limits fine dust polluting other countries.

Turkey's coal is almost all low calorie lignite, but government policy supports its continued use. In contrast Germany is closing lignite-fired stations under 150 MW. Drought in Turkey is frequent, but thermal power stations use significant amounts of water.

Coal-fired power stations are the largest source of greenhouse gas. Coal-fired stations emit over 1 kg of carbon dioxide for every kilowatt hour generated, over twice that of gas power. Academics suggest that, in order to reach Turkey's target of carbon neutrality by 2053, coal power should be phased out by the mid-2030s. In January 2023 the National Energy Plan was published: it forecast a capacity increase to 24.3 GW by 2035. The plan forecasts coal generation decreasing but capacity payments continuing for flexible and baseload power.

Energy policy

Energy strategy includes increasing the share of not just renewable energy in Turkey, but also other  local energy resources to support the country's development and to reduce dependence on energy imports.  Turkey has not ratified the Gothenburg Protocol on emissions ceilings for sulphur dioxide and nitrogen oxides. Earlier in 2021 Turkey ratified the Paris Agreement to limit climate change, but  policy was still to increase domestic coal share in the energy mix, and planned increases in coal power were forecast to increase  emissions.

Generation 

Coal-fired power stations generate approximately one third of the nation's electricity: in 2020 made up of 62 TWh from imported coal and 44 TWh from local coal (almost all lignite).  there are 55 licensed coal-fired power stations with a total capacity in July 2022 of 21.0961 gigawatts (GW). There is no unlicensed coal power. The average thermal efficiency of Turkey's coal-fired power stations is 36%. Generation fell in 2021 due to the high cost of imported coal (over $70 /MWh).   Emba Hunutlu was the last coal plant to be built and started up in 2022. No other coal-fired power stations are likely to be constructed.  Typical thermal efficiencies are 39%, 42% and 44% for subcritical, supercritical and ultra supercritical power stations.

Much of the operational fleet was built in the 21st century. There was oversupply of generating capacity and a drop in demand in 2020, and a  quarter of power stations were estimated to be cashflow negative.  According to Bloomberg New Energy Finance the capital cost of building 10 GW of coal-power would fund construction of 25 GW of solar power.  Also solar generation fits better with consumption, as annual peak electricity demand is on summer afternoons, due to air conditioning.

Germany is closing lignite-fired stations under 150 MW. Neighbouring Greece is closing down all its lignite-fueled power stations. The 1320 MW Emba Hunutlu coal fired power station was expected to start operating in 2022 despite protests, but by June had not done so. Shanghai Electric Power said it would be China's largest ever direct investment in Turkey. However, according to the World Wide Fund for Nature, it could not make a profit if it was not subsidized. Afşin-Elbistan C and further new coal-fired power stations will probably not be constructed, due to public opposition, court cases, and the risk of them becoming stranded assets.

Yunus Emre power station was completed in 2020, but had only generated 700 hours of power to the grid by 2022. With a few exceptions stations smaller than 200 MW provide both electricity and heat, often to factories, whereas almost all those larger than 200 MW just generate electricity. Companies owning large amounts of coal power include Eren, Çelikler, Aydem, İÇDAŞ, Anadolu Birlik (via Konya Sugar) and Diler.

Flexibility 
Turkey plans to substantially increase the contribution of solar and wind power to its mix of generation. Cost-effective system operation with a high proportion of these intermittent generation sources requires system flexibility, where other sources of generation can be ramped up or down promptly in response to changes in intermittent generation. However, conventional coal-fired generation may not have the flexibility required to accommodate a large proportion of solar and wind power. Retrofitting to increase the ramp-up rate to reach full load in 1 hour, and lower minimum generation to half max may be possible for about 9 GW (just under half) of installed capacity.

Coal industry

Government policy supports continued generation from lignite (brown coal) because it is mined locally, whereas almost all hardcoal (anthracite and bituminous coal) is imported. In 2020, 51 million tonnes (83%) of lignite and 22 million tonnes (55%) of hardcoal was burnt in power stations.

In 2020 Anadolu Birlik Holding, Çelikler Holding, Ciner Holding, Diler Holding, Eren Holding, Aydem, IC İçtaş, Kolin and Odaş, were substantially involved in electricity generation from coal.

Locally mined lignite 

Power stations burning lignite tend to be near local coalmines, such as Elbistan, because Turkish lignite's calorific value is less than 12.5 MJ/kg (and Afsin Elbistan lignite less than 5 MJ/kg, which is a quarter of typical thermal coal), and about 90% has lower heat value under 3,000 kcal/kg, so is not worth transporting. According to energy analyst Haluk Direskeneli because of the low quality of Turkish lignite large amounts of supplementary fuel oil is used in lignite fired power stations.

Imported coal 
To minimize transport costs, power stations burning imported coal are usually located on the coast; with clusters in Çanakkale and Zonguldak provinces and around Iskenderun Bay. Coal with up to 3% sulphur and minimum 5,400 kcal/kg can be imported, with capacity to burn about 25 million tons a year: in 2020 almost three quarters of imports were from Colombia. According to thinktank Ember, building new wind and solar power is cheaper than running existing coal power stations which depend on imported coal.

Air pollution

Air pollution is a significant environmental and public health problem in Turkey, and has been for decades.  A 1996 court order to shut 3 polluting power stations was not enforced. Levels of air pollution have been recorded above the World Health Organization (WHO) guidelines in 51 out of 81 provinces. As for long range air pollution, Turkey has not ratified the Gothenburg Protocol which covers PM 2.5 (fine particles), and reporting under the Convention on Long-Range Transboundary Air Pollution has been criticized as incomplete.

New flue gas emission limits were introduced in January 2020, resulting in five 20th century power stations being shut down that month because they did not meet the new limits. They were all re-licensed after improvements in 2020, such as new flue gas filters, but the effectiveness of the improvements is being questioned, as expenditure may not have been sufficient. There is not enough data regarding modern filters, due to many government ambient air monitoring points both being defective and not measuring fine particulate matter. Fine particulates (PM2.5), are the most dangerous pollutant but have no legal ambient limit.

The "Industry Related Air Pollution Control Regulation" says that flue-gas stacks must be at least 10m from the ground and 3m above the roof. Larger power stations must measure local pollutants vented into the atmosphere from the smokestack and report them to the Environment Ministry but, unlike the EU, they are not required to publish the data. In 2022 academics called for better monitoring and stricter emission limits.

Coal contributes to air pollution in big cities. Air pollution from some large coal-fired power stations is publicly visible in Sentinel satellite data. The Organisation for Economic Co-operation and Development (OECD) says that old coal-fired power stations are emitting dangerous levels of fine particulates: so it recommends reducing particulate emissions by retrofitting or closing old coal-fired power plants. Although the Turkish government receives reports of measurements of air pollution from the smokestacks of individual coal-fired power stations, it does not publish the reports, unlike the EU. The OECD has also recommended Turkey create and publish a pollutant release and transfer register.

Flue gas emission limits in milligrams per cubic metre (mg/Nm3) are:

The limits are laxer than the EU Industrial Emissions Directive and the SO2 limit for large coal-fired power plants in other countries, such as India at 100 mg/m3, and China at 35 mg/m3.

Greenhouse gas emissions 

Coal-fired power stations emit over 1 kg of carbon dioxide for every kilowatt hour generated, over twice that of gas-fired power stations.  Turkey's coal-fired power stations are the largest contributor to the country's greenhouse gas emissions.  Production of public heat and electricity emitted 138 megatonnes of  equivalent (e) in 2019, mainly through coal burning.

Turkey has approved the environmental impact assessment to build Afşin-Elbistan C,  and according to the assessment over 5 kg of  would be emitted per kWh generated. This would be less carbon efficient than any power station on the list of least carbon efficient power stations. The forecast emissions of 60 million tonnes a year from this station would be more than 10% of the nation's total greenhouse gas emissions, and would make the power station the largest point source in the world, overtaking the current Secunda CTL.

Because lignite quality varies greatly, to estimate the carbon dioxide emissions from a particular power station, the net calorific value of the lignite it burnt must be reported to the government. But this is not published, unlike some other countries. However public information from space-based measurements of carbon dioxide by Climate TRACE is expected to reveal individual large power stations in 2022, and smaller ones by GOSAT-GW in 2023 and possibly in 2025 by Sentinel-7.

A 2020 study estimated that fitting carbon capture and storage to a power station burning Turkish lignite would increase the cost of its electricity by over 50%. In 2021 Turkey targeted net zero carbon emissions by 2053. After the Paris Agreement on limiting climate change was ratified in 2021 many environmental groups called for the government to set a target year for coal phase-out.

Coal combustion emitted over 150Mt of CO2 in total in 2018, about a third of Turkey's greenhouse gas. Emissions from individual power plants over 20 MW are measured. Life-cycle emissions of Turkish coal-fired power stations are over 1 kg CO2eq per kilowatt-hour. By comparison, total annual greenhouse gas emissions by Turkey are about 520 million tonnes; thus more than a tenth of greenhouse gas emissions by Turkey would be from the planned power station.

 coal mine methane remains an environmental challenge, because removing it from working underground mines is a safety requirement but if vented to the atmosphere it is a potent greenhouse gas.

Water consumption 
Because Turkey's lignite-fired power stations have to be very close to their mines to avoid excessive lignite transport costs, they are mostly inland (see map of active coal-fired power stations in Turkey). Coal power stations may require a large quantity of water for the circulating water plant and coal washing if required. In Turkey, fresh water is used because of the locations of the plants. Between 600 and 3000 cubic metres of water is used per GWh generated, much more than solar and wind power. This intensive use has led to shortages in nearby villages and farmlands.

Ash

The mineral residue that remains from burning coal is known as coal ash, and contains toxic substances that may pose a health risk to workers in coal-fired power stations and people living or working near Turkey's large coal ash dams. A 2021 report from İklim Değişikliği Politika ve Araştırma Derneği (Climate Change Policy and Research Association) said that 2020s environmental law was being evaded by the repeated granting of less stringent 1 year temporary operating licenses, and said that coal ash storage permit criteria (inspections by universities) were unclear, so some power stations were not properly storing unhealthy coal ash . They said that some inspections may be insufficient and summarized inspection reports as:

Taxes, subsidies and incentives

Around the year 2000 government incentives were offered to build cogeneration power stations (such as autoproducers in factories but not connected to the grid), much small cogeneration was built in industrial parks or in sugar factories. About 20 of these small autoproducers were operating by 2021 but there is no list publicly available as they are not connected to the grid and no longer require licences. Because of its low calorific value lignite-fired electricity costs more to generate than in other European countries (except for Greece).

The companies which built most recent stations: Cengiz, Kolin, Limak and Kalyon; are mainly in the construction rather than the energy sector; and some say they took on lignite-power at a loss to be politically favoured for other construction projects.

In 2019 large lignite-burning stations were subsidized with capacity payments totalling over 1 billion lira (US$ million, which was over half of total capacity payments), and in 2020 over 1.2 billion lira (US$ million). In 2021 four power stations burning a mixture of lignite and imported coal also received capacity payments. This capacity mechanism has been criticised by some economists, as they say it encourages strategic capacity withholding, with a study of 2019 data showing that a 1% increase in the electricity price correlated with a 1-minute increase in length of power station generation failures. There is also a market clearing price cap of 2,000 lira(about US$ in 2021)/MWh. These economists say that auctions of firm capacity (this is done in some other countries), with a financial penalty if not delivered, would be a better mechanism.  23 coal-fired power stations are eligible for capacity mechanism payments.

Some electricity from these stations is purchased by the state-owned electricity company at a guaranteed price of US$50–55/MWh until the end of 2027. In the last quarter of 2021 the guaranteed purchase price was 458 lira(US$) per MWh. Imported coal is taxed at US$70 per tonne minus the price of coal on the international market. The EU Carbon Border Adjustment Mechanism could push coal-power after gas in the merit order: in other words it could become more expensive.

Capacity payments 
Unlike new solar and wind power in Turkey's electricity market, these were not decided by reverse auction but fixed by the government, and energy demand management is not eligible. Subsidy continues in 2020 and 13 coal fired power stations received January payments. The Chamber of Engineers (:tr:Makina Mühendisleri Odası) has called for the capacity mechanism to be scrapped.

Phase-out 

In 2019, the OECD said that Turkey's coal-fired power plant development programme is creating a high carbon lock-in risk due to the large capital costs and long infrastructure lifetimes. It also stated that energy and climate policies that are not aligned in future may prevent some assets from providing an economic return due to the transition to a low-carbon economy. Additionally, new wind or solar power is forecast to be cheaper than new coal-fired power plants by 2022 by the think tank Carbon Tracker. The average Turkish coal-fired power station is predicted to have higher long-run operating costs than new renewables by 2023 and all renewables by 2030. The insurance industry is slowly withdrawing from fossil fuels.

In 2021 the World Bank said that a plan for a just transition away from coal is needed. The World Bank has proposed general objectives and estimated the cost, but has suggested government do far more detailed planning. According to a 2021 study by several NGOs if coal power subsidies were completely abolished and a carbon price introduced at around US$40 (which is lower than the 2021 EU Allowance) then no coal power stations would be profitable and all would close down before 2030. According to Carbon Tracker in 2021 $1b of investment on the Istanbul Stock Exchange was at risk of stranding, including $300 m for EÜAŞ. Turkey has $3.2 billion in loans for its energy transition. Small modular reactors have been suggested to replace coal power.

Three coal-fired power plants, which are in Muğla Province, Yatağan, Yeniköy and Kemerköy, are becoming outdated. However, if the plants and associated lignite mines were shut down, about 5000 workers would need funding for early retirement or retraining. There would also be health and environmental benefits, but these are difficult to quantify as very little data is publicly available in Turkey  on the local pollution by the plants and mines. Away from Zonguldak mining and the coal-fired power plant employ most working people in Soma district. According to Dr. Coşku Çelik "coal investments in the countryside have been regarded as an employment opportunity by the rural population".

Notes

References

Sources

External links
 Coal in Turkey by Ekosfer
 Map of coal power stations by Global Energy Monitor
 Database of European coal stations including Turkey by Beyond Coal
 Graph of thermal power station construction funding in Turkey
 List from Openstreetmap
 Coal countdown by Bloomberg

Coal in Turkey
Electric power in Turkey